Dancing Queen - Size Large, Full Charge is an Indian Marathi language television reality dance show which aired on Zee Marathi. It was hosted by Adwait Dadarkar and judged by Sonalee Kulkarni and RJ Malishka. The show premiered from 24 September 2020 aired Thursday to Saturday and stopped on 27 December 2020 airing Grand Finale with completing 43 episodes.

Finalists 
 Pranali Chavan (Winner)
 Apoorva Undalkar
 Sangeeta Tamata
 Sneha Deshmukh
 Deepali Nemale
 Dipti Nair

References

External links 
 Dancing Queen at ZEE5
 
Marathi-language television shows
2020 Indian television series debuts
Zee Marathi original programming
2020 Indian television series endings
Indian reality television series